Športno društvo Brezje Maribor or simply ŠD Brezje  was a futsal club from Maribor, Slovenia. They won the Slovenian Futsal League two times, in 2016 and 2017.

History 
ŠD Brezje was founded in 2011, when the club started competing in the Slovenian second division. In their second season, the team was promoted to the top tier Slovenian Futsal League. After finishing in third place in the 2014–15 season, the team won the league title in the 2015–16 season, defeating FC Litija 3–1 in series in the final. The club, competing under the name PROEN Maribor due to sponsorship reasons, has also won the Slovenian Cup in the same season.

In the 2016–17 season, ŠD Brezje debuted in international competitions as the club competed in the 2016–17 UEFA Futsal Cup, where they reached the elite round. The team has won the Slovenian Cup trophy for the second time in a row during the 2016–17 season, defeating Bronx Škofije 6–2 in the final on 5 March 2017. Brezje has also defended the national title, again defeating Litija 3–1 in the final. In the 2017–18 UEFA Futsal Cup, Brezje started in the main round of the competition, where the team was eliminated with three defeats out of three games. In the same season, Brezje failed to retain the national championship as the team finished the season in third place. After the 2018–19 season, when Brezje finished as runners-up of the national league, the team was dissolved due to financial problems.

Name changes 

Club names through history:

 ŠD Brezje (2011–2013)
 RE/MAX Brezje Maribor (2014–2015)
 PROEN Maribor (2016–2017)
 FutureNet Maribor (2017–2019)

Arena 
The team played their home matches at Tabor Hall in the Tabor District of Maribor. Their secondary venue was a 2,100 capacity Lukna Sports Hall, also located in Maribor.

Season-by-season records

UEFA club competitions record 
All results list Brezje's goal tally first.

Honours 

Slovenian Championship
 Winners: 2015–16, 2016–17
 Runners-up: 2018–19

Slovenian Cup
 Winners: 2015–16, 2016–17
 Runners-up: 2018–19

Slovenian Supercup
 Runners-up: 2016, 2017

MNZ Maribor Cup
 Winners: 2013–14, 2014–15

International players
The following ŠD Brezje players were capped at full international level.

Bosnia and Herzegovina
Dario Markić
Ivan Matan

Croatia
Robert Grdović
Josip Jurić
Kristijan Postružin
Marinko Šamija

Serbia
Miloš Stojković

Slovenia
Jeremy Bukovec
Žiga Čeh
Sebastijan Drobne
Alen Fetić
Matej Fideršek
Suad Fileković
Tilen Gajser
Nikola Jandrić
Nikola Jelić
Uroš Kroflič
Tjaž Lovrenčič
Damir Puškar
Vid Sever
Milivoje Simeunović
Davorin Šnofl
Jaka Sovdat
Denis Totošković
Teo Turk
Aleš Vrabel

Managers 
Boris Šprah (2011–2013)
Dejan Kraut (2013)
Simon Šabeder (2013–2014)
Drago Adamič (2014–2015)
Senudin Džafić (2015–2016)
Robert Grdović (2016–2017)
Matej Gajser (2017–2018)
Tomislav Horvat (2018–2019)

References

External links
UEFA profile

Futsal clubs established in 2011
Futsal clubs in Slovenia
2011 establishments in Slovenia
Sport in Maribor
2019 disestablishments in Slovenia